False Dmitry III (died July 1612), historically known as Pseudo-Demetrius III, was the last and most enigmatic of three pretenders to the Russian throne who claimed to be the youngest son of Ivan the Terrible; Tsarevich Dmitry.

Biography
Supposed to have been a deacon called Sidorka, he appeared suddenly, from behind the river Narva, in the Ingrian town of Ivangorod, proclaiming himself the Tsarevich Dmitry Ivanovich, on March 28, 1611. The Cossacks, ravaging the environs of Moscow, acknowledged him as Tsar on March 2, 1612, and under threat of vengeance in case of non-compliance, the gentry of Pskov also "kissed the cross" (i.e., swore allegiance) to the rebel/criminal of Pskov (псковский вор), as he was usually nicknamed. On May 18, 1612, he fled from Pskov, was seized and delivered up to the authorities at Moscow, and was secretly executed there.

See also 
Time of Troubles
Dymitriads
False Dmitry I
False Dmitry II

Notes

References
 

False Dmitrys
Executed Russian people
1612 deaths
Year of birth unknown
17th-century executions by Russia
1611 in Europe
1612 in Europe
Impostors
1582 births